Phoolan Hasina Ramkali is a 1993 Indian Hindi-language Blaxploitation film, directed and produced by Kanti Shah. This movie was released under the banner of Mangla Films on 29 January 1993.

Plot
The story based on the life of three lady dacoits, namely Phoolan, Hasina and Ramkali. The movie starts with action of Police officer Arjun Singh, who is honest and brave of heart. Arjun arrests infamous Dacoit Kundan Singh after a sudden fight. Police constable Bahadur was injured in this encounter, but Arjun succeeded in capturing Kundan. By the help of corrupt cop Ajit, Kundan fled from the lockup and attacked Arjun's house. Arjun was killed by Kundan. Arjun's friend Inspector Badsah Khan promises that he will take revenge of this murder one day. Years later, a village girl Phoolan helps the lady police inspector Hasina to arrest one illegal arms supplier. The main arms dealer or kingpin of crime sent his goon Vikhu to kidnap Phoolan. Actually, the kingpin is Kundan, who takes the new name, Thakur Saheb. Thakur rapes Phoolan, but police officer Ajit does not take any action against the offender. Although Ispector Hasina arrests Vikhu, Ajit fabricate a false murder case against Hasina and send her into the jail. Phoolan kills two henchmen of Thakur, runs out from the area and also makes her own gang of dacoits. On another occasion, Ramkali, daughter of deceased Arjun Singh is forcefully sent into a brothel. She kills the lady brothel keeper and joins with Phoolan and Hasina. These three victimized ladies start to take revenge against their respective oppressors.

Cast
 Shakti Kapoor as Bahadur
 Sudha Chandran as Phoolan
 Sadashiv Amrapurkar as Bandit Kundan Singh
 Anupam Kher as Police officer Arjun Singh
 Kiran Kumar as Badsah Khan
 Raza Murad as Inspector Ajit
 Avtar Gill as Badrinath
 Kishore Bhanushali as Dev Anand (Duplicate)
 Vijay Saxena as Sundar
 Rajesh Vivek as Chaturdas
 Firoz Irani
 Kirti Singh as Hasina
 Aparajita

References

External links
 

1993 films
1990s Hindi-language films
1993 action films
Indian rape and revenge films
Films about outlaws
Indian films about revenge
Films scored by Dilip Sen-Sameer Sen
Films directed by Kanti Shah